Anaerosinus is a Gram-negative, non-spore-forming, obligately anaerobic, chemoorganotrophic and motile bacterial genus from the family of Sporomusaceae, with one known species (Anaerosinus glycerini).

See also
 List of bacterial orders
 List of bacteria genera

References

Further reading 
 

Negativicutes
Monotypic bacteria genera
Bacteria genera